Jeffrey Bruce Paris  (born 15 November 1944) is a British mathematician and Professor of Logic in the School of Mathematics at the University of Manchester.

Education
Paris gained his doctorate supervised by Robin Gandy at Manchester in 1969 with a dissertation on  Large Cardinals and the Generalized Continuum Hypothesis.

Research and career
Paris is known for his work on mathematical logic, in particular provability in arithmetic, uncertain reasoning and inductive logic with an emphasis on rationality and common sense principles.

Awards and honours
Paris was awarded the Whitehead Prize in 1983 and elected a Fellow of the British Academy (FBA) in 1999.

Personal life
Paris was married to Malvyn Loraine Blackburn until 1983 when he married Alena Vencovská. He has three sons and three daughters including runner Jasmin Paris.

References

20th-century British mathematicians
21st-century British mathematicians
British logicians
Living people
Academics of the University of Manchester
Fellows of the British Academy
Whitehead Prize winners
1944 births